CTV Atlantic (formerly known as the Atlantic Television, or ATV) is a system of four television stations in the Maritimes, owned and operated by the CTV Television Network, a division of Bell Media. Despite the name, it is not available on basic cable or analog in Newfoundland and Labrador even though that province is part of Atlantic Canada. 

The CTV Atlantic stations are:
 CJCH-DT – Halifax, Nova Scotia (flagship station)
 CJCB-DT – Sydney, Nova Scotia
 CKCW-DT – Moncton, New Brunswick/Charlottetown, Prince Edward Island
 CKLT-DT – Saint John, New Brunswick

All four stations refer to themselves on air as CTV, not by their call letters. CJCB and CKCW simulcast CJCH for most of the day, but air separate commercials and local telethons. CKLT is a full repeater of CKCW. However, all four stations are separately licensed by the Canadian Radio-television and Telecommunications Commission (CRTC). Station information and history is discussed in each station's own article.

History

CJCH was a charter CTV affiliate when that network began on October 1, 1961. CJCB and CKCW were established as CBC Television stations in 1954. CKCW affiliated with CTV in 1969, adding sister station CKLT the same year. Between 1969 and 1976, CKCW's relay stations in Northern New Brunswick (Campbellton, Upsalquitch Lake and Newcastle [Miramichi], plus three relay stations in Quebec) carried a combined CBC/CTV schedule, becoming full relays of CKCW after CHSJ in Saint John, the CBC affiliate in New Brunswick, established its own relays in the area.

CHUM Limited, a Toronto broadcaster, bought CJCH in 1970, CJCB in 1971 and CKCW and CKLT in 1972. After the CBC opened a relay in Sydney, CHUM switched CJCB's affiliation to CTV and merged its four Maritimes CTV affiliates into the ATV system. Shortly afterward, CKCW opened a rebroadcaster in Charlottetown, making Prince Edward Island the last province to get CTV. On February 26, 1997 (with CRTC approval given on August 28, 1997), as part of a group deal, the ATV stations were sold to CTV.

Although each station originally produced its own news and local programming, these were progressively cut back from the 1980s onward. Today, nearly all programming originates from Halifax. However, CJCB and CKCW break off from CJCH's signal to air separate commercials and locally produced telethons.

As with many regional networks, this creates a balancing act where local stories in one community or province are of little interest in another area of CTV Atlantic's coverage area, and viewers in each province feel the news division focuses too much on either New Brunswick or Nova Scotia, along with a lesser focus on Prince Edward Island. However, CTV Atlantic has had some of the highest ratings of any local newscasts in Canada, although its presence and viewing audience is somewhat less in PEI mainly as a result of competition from CBCT in Charlottetown, which provides the province's only PEI-specific newscast.

On October 11, 2005, ATV was renamed "CTV Atlantic". Most other CTV owned-and-operated stations had been renamed the prior week. Due to it being in the Atlantic Time Zone and ahead an hour of the Eastern Time Zone, some programming on CTV Atlantic airs at different times than on the master main Eastern/Central CTV feed and for programming from the United States, is actually carried ahead of its first airing on their original American networks.

Newscasts and regionally-produced programming
CTV Atlantic produces 28 hours of local programming each week. All news programs are produced in 16:9 high definition as of July 13, 2014 at CJCH's Robie Street studio in Halifax. CTV News also has news bureaus in Sydney, New Glasgow, Saint John, Fredericton and Moncton.

Current on-air news staff
 Todd Battis – Current chief anchor of CTV News at 6
 Bruce Frisko – Weekend 6 PM anchor, former host of CTV News at 5 (Maritimes)
 Jayson Baxter – Current co-host of CTV News at 5 (Maritimes)
 Maria Panopalis – Current co-host of CTV News at 5 (Maritimes)
 Kalin Mitchell - Chief Meteorologist of CTV News at 5 (Maritimes), CTV News at Six (Weekdays) and CTV News at 11:30 (Weekdays)
 Amanda Debison - Co-host of CTV Morning Live
 Ana Almeida - Co-host of CTV Morning Live
 Stephanie Tsicos - Anchor of CTV News at 11:30
 Jesse Thomas  - Anchor of CTV News at 11:30 Weekends
 Paul Hollingsworth – reporter and substitute anchor

Notable former personalities
 Steve Murphy – Host of Christmas Daddies Telethon, Host of the IWK Telethon. Stepped down as Chief Anchor on Nov. 30, 2021.
 Nancy Regan – co-host of Live at 5 (1988-2003)
 Paul Mennier – ATV Sports (1983-1993), co-host of Live at 5 (1993-1997)
 Eric Sorensen – New Brunswick News Director/anchor; now senior national affairs correspondent for Global National
 Sharon Dunn – Cape Breton weather   
 Kathy MacDougall - ATV CJCB TV News Announcer Producer 1979-84
 Janet Stewart – reporter/weekend and fill-in anchor; now at CBWT Winnipeg
 Dave Wright – anchor of the ATV Evening News, Host of The Notebook, followed by Live at 5. Was at WNEV-TV (Now WHDH-TV) for a short time; now deceased
 Allan Rowe – fill in anchor; now deceased
 Yvonne Colbert – ASN Atlantic Pulse and "On Your Side" consumer reporter, now at CBC Nova Scotia
 Starr Dobson "On Your Side" consumer reporter (1998-2003), Live at 5 co-host (2003–2013) and reporter for ATV/ASN prior to anchoring.
 Cindy Day - meteorologist; now chief meteorologist for SaltWire Network
 Paige Harrison - Director, ATV Evening News, now News Director WCVB ABC News in Boston

References

External links
 CTV Atlantic

Canadian television systems
CTV Television Network